OJSC Svyazinvest (Russian: ОАО Связьинвест) was Russia's largest telecommunications holding company. Based in Moscow, it was founded according to Order №1297 of the Russian government on November 25, 1994, and was registered on September 18, 1995. It was an entirely state-owned company until some shares were privatized in the late 1990s. Its operation including brand and subsidiaries were fully incorporated to Rostelecom, the former long-distance telephony monopoly. In late September 2013, Rostelecom completed the final stage of its reorganization, under which the state-run telecom holding Svyazinvest and 20 other firms were integrated into Rostelecom. The government's combined common stake in the merged company amounted to 51.12% after the reorganization.

American financier George Soros invested hundreds of millions of dollars in the company.  He later called it "the worst investment he's ever made".

History
The company was founded in accordance with Presidential Decree  №1989 "On Specific Features of State Management of the Public Switched Network in the Russian Federation" dated October 10, 1994, and Government Resolution  №1297 dated November 25, 1994, and Government Resolution  №742 dated July 24, 1995. Svyazinvest's charter capital was formed by consolidating state-owned stakes in 85 joint stock telecommunications companies. Svyazinvest passed official state registration on September 18, 1995.

In accordance with Resolution №618 issued by the Russian government on May 23, 1997, the Russian Federal Property Fund and the State Committee of the Russian Federation for State Property Management put up for sale an interest equaling 25% + 1 share in Svyazinvest at a cash auction without any investment terms.

In November 1999 Svyazinvest's board of directors amended the company charter and turned it into a management company. As part of the measures to assign the status of a management company to Svyazinvest work got under way to improve procedures to manage associates, specifically by consolidating companies located in one region.

In 2004, George Soros sold his stake in Svyazinvest to Len Blavatnik for $650 million.

In April 2011, Svyazinvest subsidiaries were transferred to Rostelecom.

In May 2011 with Igor Shchyogolev's support, Alexander Trubetskoy became chairman of the board and Vadim Semyonov, who is a citizen of both Canada and Russia, became CEO of Svyazinvest on 3 November 2010 replacing Evgeny Yurchenko because Yurchenko refused to support Konstantin Malofeev's decisions calling Malofeev "Russia's great raider".

Subsidiaries
 OJSC Central Telegraph (80%)
 OJSC Rostelecom (45.28%) 
 OJSC Giprosvyaz (59.99%)
 OJSC Kostroma GTS (37%)
 OJSC Bashinformsvyaz (29.31%)
 OJSC Chukotkasvyazinform (100%)
 OJSC Ingushelectrosvyaz (100%)
 OJSC Moscow mezhdugorodnaya telephone station N9 (50.67%)

Svyazinvest is three-quarters owned by Rosproperty and one-quarter owned by Rostelecom.

Management

Directors general
 Alexander Lipatov (August 1995–March 1996)
 Nail Ismailov (March 1996–April 1999)
 Oleg Belov (April 1999–October 1999)
 Valery Yashin (October 21, 1999–?)
  (June 29, 2006–present)

Chairman of the Board
 Nikolay Pozhitkov (until April 1999)
 Boris Ponomarenko (April 1999–July 1999)
 Russia's Minister of Science and Technology Vladimir Bulgak (July 15, 1999–June 2000)
 Russia's Minister of Communication and Informatization Leonid Reiman (June 26, 2000–present)
 

As of June 29, 2006, Svyazinvest's Board of Directors included the following as members:
 Leonid Reiman, Chairman – Minister for Information Technologies and Communications
 Boris Antonyuk – Deputy Minister for Information Technologies and Communications
 Kirill Androsov – Deputy Minister for Economic Development and Trade
 Vadim Stepanov – Secretary of State, Deputy Director of the Russian Federal Protection Service
 Lyudmila Pridanova – Deputy Head of Rosimushchestvo
 Karen Markaryan – Assistant Deputy Head of the RF Government Executive Office
 Vasiliy Popick – Assistant of the RF President's Expert Department
 Anatoly Akimenko – Representative, Mustcom Ltd.
 Sergei Karpukhovich – Representative, Mustcom Ltd.

As of June 29, 2006, the Management Board included the following as members:
 Alexander Kiselyov, Chairman – Director General
 Stanislav Panchenko (Deputy Director General)
 Konstantin Belyaev (Deputy Director General)
 Evgeny Chechelnitsky (Deputy Director General)
 Vladimir Zhelonkin (Deputy Director General)

See also
 Quantum Group of Funds

Notes

References

External links

 Official  Svyazinvest website—
History of the JSC Svyazinvest company—

 
Defunct telecommunications companies
Telecommunications companies of Russia
Internet service providers of Russia
Mobile phone companies of Russia
Companies based in Moscow
Telecommunications companies established in 1993
Technology companies disestablished in 2013
1993 establishments in Russia
2013 disestablishments in Russia
Defunct companies of Russia
Rostelecom